The bidding process for the 2023 FIBA Basketball World Cup was the procedure for the International Basketball Federation (FIBA) in choosing the hosts for the 2023 FIBA Basketball World Cup. Originally, national federations are allowed to bid for both the 2019 and 2023 editions, but on 16 March 2015, FIBA announced the 2019 edition will be held in Asia, which was then awarded to China on 7 August 2015. The 2023 Basketball World Cup will be held in three Asian countries; Philippines, Indonesia, and Japan. It will be the first Basketball World Cup to be held in multiple countries and the second straight World Cup to be staged in Asia. The decision was announced during FIBA's year-end meeting on 9 December 2017.

Calendar

Background
On 7 June 2016, FIBA approved the bidding process for the 2023 FIBA Basketball World Cup.

Joint bids by member federations was approved by the FIBA Central Board starting from the 2023 edition and there is no restriction for a country from the confederation which hosted the previous edition (China of FIBA Asia) to bid for the World Cup hosting rights.

On 1–2 November 2016, FIBA organized a bidding workshop on the 2023 FIBA Basketball World Cup and its bidding process. On 1 June 2017, FIBA confirmed the list of candidates for the hosting of the World Cup. Solo bidders Russia and Turkey ended their bids, leaving joint bids of Philippines-Japan-Indonesia and Argentina-Uruguay left in the race.

After Philippines-Japan-Indonesia won the bid. Argentina-Uruguay may have fallen short, later they withdrawn the bid for 2027.

Candidate countries

Withdrawn candidate countries

Earlier bidding workshop participants
The following National Federations not bidding to host the 2023 FIBA World Cup participated in a workshop held by FIBA on 1–2 November 2016 on the Basketball World Cup 2023 bidding process:

Earlier interested in bidding
 
Qatar was reported to have entered a bid when FIBA asked to bid for the 2019 and 2023 FIBA Basketball World Cups and specified that it was the only nation interested solely for 2023. They hosted the 2005 FIBA Asia Championship. However, Qatar was not present at the FIBA bidding workshop for the 2023 FIBA Basketball World Cup.

Selection
The FIBA Central Board decided on the winning bid on 9 December 2017, during its year-end meeting in Mies, Switzerland.

References

bids
FIBA Basketball World Cup bids